Vanishing Son is an American action television series that was part of Universal Television's Action Pack. Starting as a series of four television films in 1994, the series debuted in  syndication on January 16, 1995. Vanishing Son I, Vanishing Son II, Vanishing Son III, and Vanishing Son IV, were aired on February 28, July 18, July 25, and October 10, 1994, respectively. The series was ground-breaking for the casting of an Asian male in an attractive leading-man role.

Synopsis
Russell Wong starred as Jian-Wa Chang, a musician who escaped from the People's Republic of China after being involved in a protest similar to, and essentially working as a direct stand in, for the historically relevant 1989 Tiananmen Square protests. Jian-Wa escapes the subsequent massacre of students by the government. It is at this point the general theme of the show starts, as he and his brother Wago Chang (Chi Muoi Lo), who also was involved with the protests, escape to the United States. The story focuses on the two brothers as one pursues the "American Dream" through his music, while the other becomes drawn to a life of organized crime in order to achieve this goal.

Vanishing Son I
Vanishing Son I covers Jian-Wa and Wago's life in China, where Jian-Wa is taught in violin by Teacher Beaton (Rob Cohen) and both Jian-Wa and Wago are trained in martial arts by Sifu Yamou (John Cheung). Both Jian-Wa and Wago participate in political demonstrations with their friend, Lili (Vivian Wu). As a result of getting into an altercation with military guards, their father, Louyung Chang (Kay Tong Lim), tells them to flee or else risk being arrested or killed by the Secret Police. They consequently emigrate to the United States via a fishing boat and are apprehended by a federal Immigration Agent named Estabrook (Paul Butler). After they are brought to a jail in San Bruno, Agent Estabrook uncovers photos of Jian-Wa and Wago in Time and releases them due to the asylum laws. After they attempt to get a series of low-paying odd jobs in and around Los Angeles, Jian-Wa becomes a musician and falls in love with a cellist, Clair Rutledge (Rebecca Gayheart). Wago joins a gang led by Fu Qua Johnson (Marcus Chong), whom the brothers met in jail. As Jian-Wa performs gigs and his relationship with Clair strengthens, Wago rises in the ranks of the criminal underworld. We also find out that Fu Qua's gang is ultimately run by a Vietnamese mobster named "The General" (Haing S. Ngor). Jian-Wa's life with Clair is encroached upon when he senses that Wago is in danger and rushes to protect him in a violent shootout at a Vietnamese tavern. After Wago refuses to flee with him along with police sirens closing in on the tavern, he retreats and returns to Clair. The next morning, she awakens to find she is alone and reads Jian-Wa's letter professing his love for her, yet it is his dedication to his brother that has forced him to leave as he is wanted for questioning by authorities.

Vanishing Son II
In Vanishing Son II, Jian-Wa goes on the road to evade being questioned by the authorities about criminal activities and murders committed by his brother, Wago.  Jian-Wa hitchhikes to a gulf community in Louisiana, where he meets a population of Vietnamese fishermen. The community consists of an elderly patriarch (Kim Chan), a quick-tempered young man named Hung (Dustin Nguyen), and his sister, Lanchi (Tamlyn Tomita), whom Jian-Wa is attracted to. A woman named Mai (Ming-Na Wen) lives in the community and falls for Reggie Valmont (Jamie Walters), the son of a local fisherman and Ku Klux Klan member named Mickey Jo (Dean Stockwell). Tensions between the Ku Klux Klan and the Vietnamese community explode in Little Saigon when Hung kills a local white fisherman in self-defense. Jian-Wa is planning to leave again when the Sheriff seeks him out for interrogation after having witnessed the event, but he reconsiders with Lanchi's persuasion. Reggie, who is also a witness, is torn between lying to please the good old boys and following his convictions. Ku Klux Klan members storm the Vietnamese community, and just when Jian-Wa and Hung are about to lose the fight, Wago arrives on the scene and rescues them. Jian-Wa bids farewell to Lanchi and the Vietnamese once the National Guard and police units infiltrate the area and goes to Washington, D.C. for a violin competition. The final scene reunites Wago with the woman he loves, Lili (Vivian Wu), who was thought to have been killed by the Secret Police in China during the riots.

Vanishing Son III
In Vanishing Son III, Jian-Wa is playing in a violin competition in Washington D.C. when he unexpectedly reunites with Clair again. He tells her the truth about Wago's crimes and the promise he made to their father to protect him. The two promptly rekindle their flame, yet it is short-lived once Jian-Wa returns to Los Angeles with her and is arrested by a federal task force bent on apprehending Wago and members of his gang. He is forced to go undercover to infiltrate the gang for information on a man called The General, but Jian-Wa is intending to utilize his position to rescue his brother. Meanwhile, with Fu Qua dead, Wago ascends to the top of The General's criminal organization, working with him, Lili, and a former Triad named Chou Pei (Luoyong Wang) to take down the "dragonheads" of the Triads. Jian-Wa works for Wago and is given designer suits, a new home, and a brand new car. Jian-Wa resists romantic advancements from Lili, mindful of Wago's love for her. When Jian-Wa happens upon Clair once more while at a nightclub with Wago and Lili, Lili becomes envious and attempts to kill Clair with a car explosive after failing to seduce Jian-Wa one last time. Although she walked away from the event unharmed, Clair's close friend and fellow musician, Michael, is accidentally murdered in her place. Faced with the brutality that is organized crime, Clair questions Jian-Wa's involvement in a criminal lifestyle. Jian-Wa promises her protection and gives her a plane ticket to a safe location. Enraged, Jian-Wa confronts Lili over her orders to eliminate Clair and rebukes her as only a tool to be used by The General. Wago turns against his brother out of blind loyalty to Lili and resentment when Jian-Wa tries to confide in him about Lili's deception. Jian-Wa visits Estabrook later and learns that The General is a high-level CIA operative, and Lili is working with him (and is also his lover), planning to set up Wago to take a fall. In the climax, Wago's gang and the Triads are seized by government agents during an ambush. Amid the chaos, Jian-Wa faces off with Wago and Lily. Witnessing Wago become taken in by Jian-Wa's words, Lili manages to steal Wago's gun. Failing to de-escalate with Lili, Wago tries to subdue her, and the gun discharges, instantly killing her and fatally wounding himself. Before his last breath, he tells a mournful Jian-Wa that he never stopped loving him through everything. Estabrook and the task force happen upon the bodies of Wago and Lili as they scour the area. Jian-Wa has escaped.

Vanishing Son IV
In Vanishing Son IV, tormented by his brother's death, Jian-Wa is roaming around the countryside at night when he gets struck by a truck driven by two intoxicated teenagers, Adams (Mark Valley) and Dawson (Matthew Lillard). Jian-Wa is taken in by a reclusive woman named Megan (Dee Wallace) who lives nearby. While Jian-Wa recovers, he rouses the interest of Megan on his identity. At first, Jian-Wa is unwilling to discuss the past, but with reassurance from the spirit of Wago, whom only he can see, he opens up. Through the learning of Jian-Wa's dark past, it is revealed that Megan has a dark past of her own and has chosen to isolate herself out of heavy guilt over the death of her young son in a carjacking incident. The two slowly connect through their shared heartaches. Jian-Wa urges her to make peace with her child's death and persevere. Once Wago's spirit warns him of impending danger, Jian-Wa fights off the two teenagers as they raid the cabin in an attempt to remove all evidence of their hit-and-run. Megan comes to terms with her son's death and goes into town to get the police. Jian-Wa takes to the road.

13 episode series
The 13-episode series occurs after the events of Vanishing Son IV. At the end of Vanishing Son III, two US Federal Agents were killed and Jian-Wa is held responsible, therefore he constantly is on the run from the authorities. However, "The General" is the true mastermind behind the murders. Jian-Wa becomes a fugitive, using his wisdom, music, and martial arts skills to solve problems along the way on his quest to bring "The General" to justice. The series has a lighter tone compared to the darker tone of the previous four telefilms in order to match the 1990s TV show nature of the series where Jian-Wa undertakes another adventure each episode. The music, as well as the opening theme song, was also composed by Jan Hammer.

As he helps others while traveling across America, he is aided by the spirit of his deceased brother, Wago, and meets an assortment of different characters along the way, including becoming involved with a Latina labor organizer nicknamed V (Jacqueline Obradors) (Episode 1 - Dance of The Dust), helping a man (Matt Letscher) track down information about his Vietnam war veteran of a father and fighting another martial artist named Nguyen (Yuji Okumoto) (Episode 2 - Holy Ghosts), coming to the aid of the Irish wife (Mary Elizabeth McGlynn) of a Texan ostrich farmer who physically abuses her and testifying in court for her innocence when she accidentally murders him in defense (Episode 3 - Birds of Paradise), reuniting with Hung (Dustin Nguyen) and Lanchi (Tamlyn Tomita) in Oakland, California, where they moved to from Louisiana, and getting caught up in a gang dispute involving Hung and Lanchi's caucasian boyfriend (Episode 4 - Single Flame), getting hired as a bodyguard/driver for the daughter (Aimee Brooks) of a wealthy man that lives in Rancho Santa Fe, only to find out that the daughter is more manipulative than she seems (Episode 5 - Sweet Sixteen), being helped by an eccentric man named Issac (Kurt Fuller) who can also see the spirit of Wago (Episode 6 - Miracle Under 34th Street), assisting a Chinese art smuggler and con artist named Dinah Lai (Una Damon) with recovering some stolen artifacts from the Han Dynasty that she intends to sell in order to free her friends in China (Episode 7 - Runaway Hearts), becoming embroiled in a twisted game run by a sadistic couple (Sofia Milos and Nicholas Guest) where a young African American boy named Cliff (Brandon Hammond) and his Electrical Engineer father Ray (Bobby Hosea) also get caught up in (Episode 8 - Lock and Load, Babe), getting kidnapped along with another young girl named Beth (Dorie Barton) by two brothers, George Bruce (Stephen Ramsey) and Tom Bruce (Steve Larson) who are armed with guns and want to go down in history as famous criminals (Episode 9 - Two Guys with Guns), helping out at a stable that breeds competitive horses and developing a relationship with a young rider named Tina (Alexandra Tydings) who ends up getting sabotaged by the proprietor of the stable, Harry (Forry Smith) (Episode 10 - Win, Place or Dead), comes to the aid of a singer named Dana (Sherrie Rose) in New Jersey (Episode 11 - Jersey Girl), gets hired as a maitre d' "that women can fantasize about" by an owner of a restaurant, Rachel (Catherine Bell), who is reminded of her deceased former lover Mark whenever she sees Jian-Wa (who goes by "Jack") (Episode 12 - Long Ago and Far Away), and assists another musician (flute player) he knew from the Beijing Philharmonic named Yu Lin (Peter James Smith) free the clutches of a Triad criminal organization who he serves as a bookkeeper for known as the Tien-Ching gang led by "dailo" White Powder Ma (George Chung) and his nephew Benny Ping (Stan Egi) in San Francisco, and which also has ties to The General (Episode 13 - Land of the Free).

In the series, Jian-Wa is constantly on the run from ruthless Federal Agent Dan Sandler (Jason Adams), the direct superior of the agents killed in the two-hour films. Agent Judith Phillips (Stephanie Niznik) was a member of Sandler's team who was convinced that Jian-Wa was innocent and she gradually became his ally. This put her at great odds with Sandler.

The series was not renewed after the first thirteen-episode season aired.

Cast
Russell Wong as Jian-Wa Chang
Chi Muoi Lo as Wago Chang
Stephanie Niznik as Agent Judith Phillips
Jason Adams as Dan Sandler

Episodes

References

External links
 
 
 
 
 

1990s American drama television series
1995 American television series debuts
1995 American television series endings
American action television series
Action Pack (TV programming block)
English-language television shows
First-run syndicated television programs in the United States
Martial arts television series
Television series by Universal Television
American martial arts films
Films about Chinese Americans
Chinese American television
Films directed by John Nicolella